Here is an overview of the teams which took part at the 1993 Rugby World Cup Sevens.

Pool A

Head Coach: Gysie Pienaar
Chris Badenhorst
Jannie Claassens
André Joubert
Hannes Kriese
Ruben Kruger
Dick Muir
Dion O'Cuinnegain
Jacques Olivier
Joost van der Westhuizen
Chester Williams

Coach: Joe Sawailau
Etonia Nadura
Samisoni Rabaka
Mesake Rasari
Vesi Rauluni
Viliame Rauluni
Waisale Serevi
Fili Seru
Sakeasi Vonolagi
Jone Vueti
Penisoni Waki
Noa Nadruku

Coach: Bob Norster
Simon Davies
Robert Howley
Neil Jenkins
Emyr Wyn Lewis
Rupert Moon
Mark Perego
Wayne Proctor
Mark Thomas
David Williams
Andrew Williams

Takeomi Ito
Hironaga Kato
Sinali Latu
Tsutomu Matsuda
Yukio Motoki
Yoji Nagatomo
Paulo Nawalu
Shinji Ono
Hirofumi Ouchi
Yoshihito Yoshida

Coach: Paul Ciobanel
Cătălin Drăguceanu
Andrei Gurănescu
Șerban Gurănescu
Nicușor Marin
Adrian Mitocaru
Daniel Neaga
Cătălin Sasu
Bogdan Șerban
Ștefan Tofan
Vasile Udroiu
Martac Marius Cornel

Head Coach: Uldis Bautris

Lauris Ērenpreiss
Pāvels Ivanovs
Aleksandrs Karaulovs
Vladimirs Ņikonovs
Nikolajs Petjuņins
Vjačeslavs Sņetkovs
Vadims Stepanovs
Kaspars Vekša
Armands Višņevskis
Demjans Zavadskis

Pool B

Coach:: Peter Thorburn Manager:: M. Shannon

Todd Blackadder
Frank Bunce
Stuart Forster
Pat Lam
Glen Osborne
Junior Paramore
Nick Penny
Eric Rush
Dallas Seymour
John Timu

Head Coach: Noel Murphy

Chae Deuk-Joon
Cho Doo-Hwan
Cho Sung-Chul
Choi Chang-Yul
Neil Crooks
Kang Dong-Ho
Kim Yeon-Ki
Lee Keun-Wook
Park Jin-Bae
Sung Hae-Kyung

Philippe Bernat-Salles
David Berty
Eric Bonneval
Laurent Cabannes
Dominique Dal Pos
Christophe Deylaude
Didier Faugeron
Said Filali
Thierry Janeczek
Ugo Mola

Coach: Steve Finkel
Will Brewington  (Maryland Old Boys)
Jim Burgett (Old Puget Sound Beach)
Andrew Dujakovich (Kansas City)
Gary Hein (Old Blue RFC)
John Hinkin (OMBAC)
Chris O'Brien (Old Blue RFC)
Tony Ridnell (Old Puget Sound Beach)
Scott Stephens (Washington RFC) 
Mike Telkamp (Old Puget Sound Beach)
Brian Vizard (OMBAC)

Paul Blom
Gottfried Bos
Martin Geelhord
André Marcker
Terepal Marcker
Martijn Nagtegaal
Arno Seybel
Erik Tabak
Bernardus Verhofstad
Bart Wieringa

Pool C

Coach: 'Ila Tapueluelu
Isi Fatani
Samisoni Lolo
Teutau Loto'ahea
Finau Ma'afu
Feleti Mahoni
Isi Tuivai
Tevita Vaʻenuku
Elisi Vunipola
Manu Vunipola
Willie Wolfgramm

Matt Burke  (New South Wales)
David Campese (New South Wales)
Ryan Constable (Queensland)
Jin Fenwicke
John Flett  (New South Wales)
Ronnie Kirkpatrick
Grant Lodge  (New South Wales)
Michael Lynagh  (New South Wales)
Willie Ofahengaue (New South Wales)
Ilie Tabua (Queensland)
Semi Taupeaafe  (New South Wales)

Head Coaches: Ricardo Paganini and Miguel Setién
Lisandro Arbizu (Belgrano Athletic)
Pedro Baraldi (Jockey Club Rosario)
Gonzalo Camardón (Alumni)
Fernando del Castillo (Jockey Club Rosario)
Gonzalo García (Duendes)
Hernan Garcia Simon (Pueyrredón)
Horacio Herrera (Córdoba Athletic)
Gustavo Jorge (Pucará)
Santiago Mesón (Tucumán R.C.)
Martín Terán   (Tucumán R.C.)
Cristián Viel (Newman)

Mark Appleson
Stuart Bennett
Ian Corcoran
Carl Hogg
John Kerr
Dave Millard
Mark Moncrieff
Andrew Nicol
Gregor Townsend
Derek Turnbull
Fergus Wallace
Doddie Weir

Michelangelo Amore (CUS Catania)
Stefano Barba (Milan)
Massimo Bonomi (Milan)
Marcello Cuttitta (Milan)
Diego Dominguez (Milan)
Ivan Francescato (Benetton Treviso)
Nicola Giuliato (US Casale)
Javier Pértile (Rugby Roma Olympic)
Francesco Pietrosanti (L'Aquila)
Paolo Vaccari (Milan)

Hwang Chao-Hsien
Hwang Kuo-Cheng
Juang Gwo-Jin
Kao Chiya-Liang
Lee Wan-Rien
Lin Chih-Shao
Liu Pe-Yi
Murray Wallace
Tseng Chi-Ming
Weng Ching-Shue
Wu Tsu-Chi

Pool D

Coach: Taufusi Salesa Manager:Marina Schaffhausen
Andrew Aiolupo (Moata'a)
Alama Ieremia (Wellington)
Danny Kaleopa (Moata'a)
Lolani Koko (Moata'a)
Brian Lima (Marist St Joseph)
Veli Patu (Vaiala)
Ofisa Tonu'u (Wellington)
To'o Vaega (Vaiala)
Sila Vaifale (Marist St Joseph)
Alefaio Vaisuai (Moata'a)

Coach: Les Cusworth

 Adedayo Adebayo
 Nick Beal
 Justyn Cassell
 Lawrence Dallaglio
 Matt Dawson
 Andrew Harriman (c)
 Damian Hopley
 Tim Rodber
 Chris Sheasby
 Dave Scully
 Michael Dods*

* player from Reserve pool

Jon Azkargorta - (Centre/Fullback) - Getxo RT
 Francisco Puertas (Fullback/Fly-half) - Bayonne
 Pablo Calderón (Centre) - CD Arquitectura
 José Miguel Villaú (Lock) -
 Unai Aurrekoetxea (Fly half) - 
 Alberto Malo (Flanker/Number 8) - UE Santboiana
 Jon Etxebarria (Flanker) - 
 Iñaki Laskurain - (Flanker) - Getxo RT
 Javier Díaz (Scrum-half) -
 José Ángel Hermosilla (Wing) - Valladolid RAC 
 Pablo Gutiérrez (Fullback) - Moraleja Alcobendas Rugby Union
 Gabriel Rivero (Centre/Fullback) - 
 Jaime Gutiérrez (Flanker) - Moraleja Alcobendas Rugby Union

Coach:  Ian Birtwell

Al Charron
Barry Ebl
John Graf
Dave Lougheed
Julian Loveday
Gord MacKinnon
Scott MacKinnon
Scott Stewart
Chris Tynan

Coach:  George Simpkin

Adam Adair
Ashley Billington
David Bulbeck
Stephen Burton
Philippe Lacamp
Simon Litster
Craig Pain
Ian Strange
Mark Thomas
Stuart Krohn

Gerhard Barnard
Johan Barnard
Basie Buitendag
Piet du Plooy
André Hutsamen
Gerhard Mans
Michel Marais
Eden Meyer
Scott Nicol
Henning Snyman
Pieter von Wielligh

External links
 1993 Rugby World Cup Sevens teams at World Rugby

References

Rugby World Cup Sevens squads